Anne-Rose Waruguru Matindi (born 1942) is a Kenyan nurse and children's writer, known for her plays aimed at elementary school children.

Life
Mrs Anne Matindi was born in Murang'a District, Kenya, and was educated at Nginda Girls' School and Kahuhia Girls' School. By the time of her first collection of stories in 1967, she was married with three children.

Matindi's stories, set in East Africa, are often amusing traditional stories about domestic animals.

Works
 The sun and the wind. Nairobi : East African Publishing House, 1967. Illustrations by Adrienne Moore. East African junior library, no. 7.
 The lonely black pig, and other stories. Nairobi: East African Pub. House, 1968. East African junior library, no. 5.
 Jua na Upepo; na hadithi nyingine. Nairobi: East African Pub. House, 1968. Hadithi za kikwetu, 3. (Short story in Swahili.)
 (with Cynthia Hunter) The sun-men and other plays. Nairobi: East African Publishing House, 1971. Illustrations by Beryl Moore. Plays for primary schools, 1.
 The Kasiwes and their animals, and other stories. Nairobi : Phoenix, 1996. Illustrations by Emmanuel Kariuki. Phoenix young readers library.

References

1942 births
Kenyan nurses
Kenyan children's writers
20th-century Kenyan writers
20th-century Kenyan women writers
Kenyan women children's writers
People from Murang'a County
Living people